The Massachusetts Bay Transportation Authority (MBTA) operates two specially designated crosstown bus routes in the Boston, Massachusetts, United States area, called CT2 and CT3, and intended as limited-stop buses connecting major points. The two weekday-only routes largely parallel MBTA bus local routes, but with fewer stops to reduce travel times.

Three crosstown routes – CT1, CT2, and CT3 – were introduced in 1994. Eight additional routes numbered CT4 through CT11 were proposed as part of an interim phase of the Urban Ring Project to provide circumferential service bypassing the crowded downtown subway stations, but were never put in service. Route CT1 was merged with route  in 2019.

CT1

The CT1 Central Square, Cambridge–B.U. Medical Center/Boston Medical Center via M.I.T. (internally coded 701) ran between Central Square in Cambridge and the B.U. Medical Center/Boston Medical Center, mostly along Massachusetts Avenue. The majority of its route was a limited-stop version of route . Transfers to the 1 were possible at most of the stops. CT1 service was not substantially modified since its 1994 inception. Route CT1 was merged into route 1 in September 2019 to provide more frequent service and more consistent headways.

Station listing

CT2

The CT2 Sullivan Square station–Ruggles station (internally coded 747) connects Sullivan Square in Charlestown with Ruggles in Roxbury via Kendall Square in Cambridge. The route was created as a Ruggles–Kendall route in September 1994. In September 2000, the route was extended to Sullivan via Union Square.

, the route has 25-minute headways on weekday morning peaks, 40-minute headways on weekday afternoon peaks, and 60-minute headways middays. It does not have evening or weekend service. In May 2022, the MBTA released a draft plan for a systemwide network redesign. The draft called for route CT2 to be discontinued. A revised proposal in November 2022 again called for route CT2 to be discontinued, though the route 39 extension would be replaced with a more frequent route 47.

Station listing

CT3

The CT3 Beth Israel Deaconess Hospital–Andrew Station (internally coded 708) connects the Longwood Medical Area to Andrew Square and runs entirely within the city of Boston.

The CT3 route started as Beth Israel–Andrew, but it was extended to Logan Airport in December 1998. The extension (internally coded 709) was dropped due to low ridership in March 2002. In January 2005, some rush hour service was rerouted to serve Newmarket Square.

, the route has 20–22 minute headways at peak hours, 30-minute headways in the early afternoon, and 80-minute headways midday. It does not have evening or weekend service. The May 2022 draft network plan called for route CT3 to be discontinued. It would be largely replaced by a new – route running via Huntington Avenue, Ruggles station, Andrew station, and D Street. The November 2022 revised plan rerouted the replacement route Brookline Avenue, Roxbury Crossing station, and Nubian station.

Station listing

See also
List of MBTA bus routes
List of key MBTA bus routes

References

External links

CT2 schedule and map
CT3 schedule and map

MBTA bus routes
MBTA